Ponni C/O Rani is a Tamil language soap opera which premiered on 27 June 2022 in Kalaignar TV. The show stars Preethi Sanjeev, Arjun and Dhanushiva in lead roles along with Raadhika Sarathkumar in pivotal role. It is produced by Radaan Mediaworks. It is a Sequel to the 2013 series Vaani Rani.

Cast

Main cast

Preethi Sanjeev as Ponni Rajaram
Raadhika Sarathkumar in a dual role as: 
Rani Saaminathan 
Adv. Vani Bhoominathan 
Arjun as Surya Rajaram
Dhanushiva as Pavithra Surya

Recurring cast

Dhachayani / VJ Thara as Pooja
Shankaresh Kumar as Chandru
Aruljothi Arockiaraj / VJ Mounika as Swetha Chandru
Manohar Krishnan as Rajaram
Unknown / Usha Elizabeth Suraj as Visalam Vinayagam
Nancy / Sherin Jaanu as Aishwarya 
Sasilaya as Maya
Harish G as Senthil 
A. Ravivarma as Vinayagam
Karpagavalli as Pounu
Hema Chinaraj as Priya
Arvind Kathare / Birla Bose as Manickam
Vincent Roy as Ponni's father
Raghavi Sasikumar as Pushpavalli Anand (deceased) 
Vetrivelan as Anand (deceased)
Shri Akila as Bhuvana (deceased)

Production

Development 
This is Radaan Mediaworks and Radikaa Sarathkumar's debut series on Kalaignar TV. The shooting of this serial commenced in March 2022. The first promo was released on 4 May 2022. This marks Radikaa's return to television after a small hiatus.

Casting  
Preethi Sanjeev was cast in the female lead role as Ponni. Arjun and Dhanushiva were cast as the next main leads. While Manohar Krishnan and Raghavi Sasikumar were also selected for supporting roles. Radikaa reprised her role as Vani and Rani from Vani Rani making her comeback.

References

External links
 

Kalaignar TV television series
2022 Tamil-language television series debuts
Tamil-language television shows
Television shows set in Tamil Nadu
Tamil-language sequel television series